Monique Garbrecht-Enfeldt (born 11 December 1968) is a German former ice speed skater. During her 15-year career, she became sprint world champion five times (1991, 1999, 2000, 2001, 2003), and in addition she won four gold medals in the World Single Distance Championships, two on the 500 and two on the 1000 m. She won two Olympic medals within 10 years of each other: first time at the 1992 Winter Olympics in Albertville a bronze, and in the 2002 Olympics in Salt Lake City a silver. She also had planned to qualify for the 2006 Olympics in Torino but poor results in the season's first World Cup races got her to delay the plans. On 1 July 2000 she married her manager, Swedish former speed skater Magnus Enfeldt. On 1 December 2005 she announced her retirement from speed skating.

Speed skating

Personal records

World records

Results overview

References

External links

 Photos of Monique Garbrecht-Enfeldt

1968 births
German female speed skaters
Speed skaters at the 1992 Winter Olympics
Speed skaters at the 1994 Winter Olympics
Speed skaters at the 1998 Winter Olympics
Speed skaters at the 2002 Winter Olympics
Olympic speed skaters of Germany
Medalists at the 1992 Winter Olympics
Medalists at the 2002 Winter Olympics
Olympic medalists in speed skating
Olympic silver medalists for Germany
Olympic bronze medalists for Germany
World record setters in speed skating
Sportspeople from Potsdam
Living people
World Single Distances Speed Skating Championships medalists